The 2014 Polish Super Cup was held on 9 July 2014 between the 2013–14 Ekstraklasa winners Legia Warsaw and the 2013–14 Polish Cup winners Zawisza Bydgoszcz. Zawisza Bydgoszcz won the match 3–2, winning the trophy for the first time in their history.

Match details

See also
2013–14 Ekstraklasa
2013–14 Polish Cup

References

SuperCup
Polish Super Cup